Antonio Yaqigi (born 6 January 1941) is a Chilean former sports shooter. He competed at the 1972 Summer Olympics and the 1976 Summer Olympics.

References

1941 births
Living people
Chilean male sport shooters
Olympic shooters of Chile
Shooters at the 1972 Summer Olympics
Shooters at the 1976 Summer Olympics
Place of birth missing (living people)
Pan American Games medalists in shooting
Pan American Games silver medalists for Chile
Pan American Games bronze medalists for Chile
Shooters at the 1971 Pan American Games
Shooters at the 1979 Pan American Games
20th-century Chilean people